Nora was a mountain fortress and town of ancient Cappadocia, on the frontiers of Lycaonia. Located at the foot of Mount Taurus, in which Eumenes was for a whole winter besieged by Antigonus (319 BC), before he escaped. In Strabo's time it was called Neroassus or Neroassos (Νηροασσός), and served as a treasury to Sicinus, who was striving to obtain the sovereignty of Cappadocia.

Its site is tentatively located near Gelin tepe in (Aksaray Province), a small mound lying c.  east to the modern town of Güzelyurt and behind the village of Sivrihisar Asiatic Turkey.

References

Populated places in ancient Cappadocia
Former populated places in Turkey
Populated places of the Byzantine Empire
History of Aksaray Province